The 2010 season is the 24th season played by the United Soccer Leagues. Season titles will be contested by 6 professional men's clubs in the USL Second Division, 29 professional and amateur women's clubs in the W-League, and 68 professional and amateur men's teams in the USL Premier Development League.

The remaining USL First Division teams that did not break away to form the North American Soccer League, as well as the NASL teams, will play in the D2 Pro League this year.

The Second Division season started on April 17 with 3 games: Charleston Battery at Charlotte Eagles, Richmond Kickers hosting Harrisburg City Islanders, and Pittsburgh Riverhounds at Real Maryland Monarchs. The season closed on August 14 with Pittsburgh at Harrisburg, Real Maryland at Richmond, and Charleston hosting Charlotte.

First Division
See: USSF Division 2 Professional League

Second Division

Regular season

Changes from 2009
 Bermuda Hogges left to compete in USL Premier Development League.
 Charleston Battery enter competition this year from USL First Division.
 Crystal Palace Baltimore left to compete in USSF Division 2 Professional League.
 Western Mass Pioneers left to compete in USL Premier Development League.
 Wilmington Hammerheads went on hiatus.

Standings

Results

Playoffs

Semifinal

Championship

Premier Development League
 See 2010 PDL season

References

External links
Official USL Site

3
2010